Innocent Pictures ApS is a Danish independent film company founded in 2001, originally as a subsidiary of Lars von Trier's film company Zentropa, which is best known for the production of the erotic feature film All About Anna (2005), starring Gry Bay.

Innocent Pictures is also responsible for erotic late night entertainment on the Danish television channel Kanal København.

In collaboration with MD Lasse Hessel, Innocent Pictures produced the educational DVD Femi-X and Beyond (2004), hosted by Danish sexologist Joan Ørting.

On another front, the company acts as sales agents for the Zentropa-produced Puzzy Power-films Constance (1998), Pink Prison (1999) and HotMen CoolBoyz (2000).

References

External links
 

Film production companies of Denmark
Mass media companies established in 2001
Mass media in Copenhagen